Power Grid Company of Bangladesh (PGCB) is a public limited company enlisted in Bangladesh at the Dhaka and Chittagong Stock Exchange.


PGCB at a Glance
Corporate Office:	PGCB Bhaban, Avenue-3, Jahurul Islam City, Aftabnagar, Badda, Dhaka-1212.
Year of Incorporation:	1996 [C-31820(941)/96].
Status:	Public Limited Company (Listed).
Business:	Transmission of Power.
Authorized Capital:	Tk. 10,000 Crore.
Paid-up Capital: 	Tk. 712.73 Crore.
Turnover (2020-2021):	Tk. 2,283.85 Crore.
Net Profit before tax (2020-2021):	Tk. 427.99 Crore.
Manpower as on 30 June, 2021:	2690 persons.

Transmission Infrastructure Information
Transmission Line :
400kV: 1397 Circuit km, 230kV:	4,022 Circuit km, 132kV: 8190 Circuit km, 187.57 Circuit km (Others).
Substation:
400kV:	1 Nos 2x500MW HVDC Back to Back station, 
400/230kV:	4 Nos 4,680 MVA, 2 Nos 1170 MVA (Others).
400/132 kV:	3 Nos 1,950 MVA.
230/132kV:	27 Nos. 15,225 MVA, 3 Nos. 7,50 MVA (Others)
230/33KV:	1 Nos. 280 MVA, 3 Nos. 910 MVA(others).
132/33kV:	125 Nos. 24,775 MVA, 40 Nos. 6,851.6 MVA (Others)
Dispatch Capacity at 33kV level:	29,535 MW (Including all organizations)

See also

 Electricity sector in Bangladesh

References

Electric power transmission system operators in Bangladesh